Lenape Heights is a census-designated place (CDP) in Armstrong County, Pennsylvania, United States. The population was 1,167 at the 2010 census.

Geography
Lenape Heights is located at  (40.765411, -79.522388).

Demographics

As of the census of 2000, there were 1,212 people, 520 households, and 368 families living in the CDP. The population density was 1,670.9 people per square mile (641.0/km). There were 543 housing units at an average density of 748.6/sq mi (287.2/km). The racial makeup of the CDP was 98.76% White, 0.25% African American, 0.08% Native American, 0.17% from other races, and 0.74% from two or more races. Hispanic or Latino of any race were 0.41% of the population.

There were 520 households, out of which 24.4% had children under the age of 18 living with them, 61.3% were married couples living together, 7.1% had a female householder with no husband present, and 29.2% were non-families. 26.0% of all households were made up of individuals, and 17.5% had someone living alone who was 65 years of age or older. The average household size was 2.33 and the average family size was 2.79.

In the CDP, the population was spread out, with 20.3% under the age of 18, 4.5% from 18 to 24, 23.4% from 25 to 44, 25.5% from 45 to 64, and 26.3% who were 65 years of age or older. The median age was 46 years. For every 100 females, there were 91.5 males. For every 100 females age 18 and over, there were 92.4 males.

The median income for a household in the CDP was $31,636, and the median income for a family was $39,265. Males had a median income of $31,184 versus $21,953 for females. The per capita income for the CDP was $20,261. About 3.6% of families and 2.9% of the population were below the poverty line, including 1.7% of those under age 18 and 2.0% of those age 65 or over.

References

Census-designated places in Armstrong County, Pennsylvania
Pittsburgh metropolitan area
Census-designated places in Pennsylvania